Spike Cape is a bare rocky point from which the Wilson Piedmont Glacier has receded, lying 4 nautical miles (7 km) south of Dunlop Island on the coast of Victoria Land. First mapped by the British Antarctic Expedition, 191013. The name was suggested by Robert Forde, and adopted by Thomas Griffith Taylor, for its likeness to Spike Island, Plymouth, England.

Headlands of Victoria Land
Scott Coast